This is the complete list of Asian Games medalists in cricket from 2010 to 2014.

Men

Women

References

External links
Olympic Council of Asia

Cricket
medalists